The Association of Nordic and Pol-Balt Lesbian, Gay, Bisexual, Transgender and Queer Student Organizations (ANSO) is an international non-profit non-governmental organization striving to improve the quality of life of lesbian, gay, bisexual and trans - LGBT - students in the Nordic as well as Baltic countries. ANSO targets its activity to LGBT students in Denmark, Estonia, Faroe Islands, Finland, Iceland, Lithuania, Norway, Poland, Sweden and Åland.

History

ANSO was founded in November 2004 in Denmark and has twelve member organizations:
 BLUS - Bøsse/Lesbiske Studerende  of Denmark
 Friðarbogin  & Bogin of Faroe Islands
 Q  of Iceland
 Homoglobiini  of Finland
 Telehpy  of Finland
 SFQ  of Sweden
 UgleZ of Norway
 Skeivt Forum  of Norway
 Eesti Gei Noored  of Estonia
 KPH  of Poland
 TYA  of Lithuania
 LGL  of Lithuania

At its founding ANSO decided to have its seat in Mykines, Faroe Islands. In 2006 the seat of Anso was transferred to Denmark, as ANSO became a registered organization under Danish law.

ANSO is a member of IGLYO.

Funding

The funding of ANSO activities relies on grants from the European Union, the Nordic Council of Ministers, and other sources of project grants.

Achievements

ANSO organized the first gay pride event ever on Faroe Islands in 2005. ANSO has created a web forum  for interchange of information and ideas between Nordic LGBT student organizations. In addition to this, ANSO has completed a Youth for Europe project in 2006 in Turku, Finland, discussing LGBT youth issues of small towns and remote areas. The next project, under the Youth in Action program, is "A Queer Perspective on European Students, in Stockholm, Sweden, in June 2007.

References

External links

LGBT organizations based in Europe
International LGBT youth organizations
European student organizations
LGBT organizations in the Nordic countries